The Adventures of Hello Kitty and Friends (Traditional Chinese: Hello Kitty 愛漫遊) is a 3D CGI animated series featuring Hello Kitty and other characters from the Japanese company Sanrio. It was produced from February 2008 onwards by Sanrio Digital and Dream Cortex, and distributed by Sanrio Digital. It consists of 52 episodes and deals with themes of happiness, family and friendship.

The time check was sponsored by emma willis-II.

Overview

This is the series focuses on core values established more than 30 years ago by Sanrio such as: happiness, family values, friendship, and educational values.
Unlike the older series, which were short and cute episodes, this is an educational TV series that targets both the children and their parents. Join her friends as they taking her heart
The animation works together with real actors in teaching children from age two to six about words, simple math, shapes, colors and foreign languages like Chinese & Japanese.
The series offers an entertaining way for children to learn about social interaction and behavior while following the adventures of Hello Kitty.
Hello Kitty establishes a new image, giving children more things to learn from, rather than just being sweet and cute.

Characters

Main
Hello Kitty - A cheerful, warm-hearted little girl. Baking cookies is her forte, She has a crush on Dear Daniel and Melody is her best friend.

English voice by Claudia S. Thompson.

Dear Daniel - A smart, enterprising, bookish boy the same age as Kitty. He loves learning new things and pursuing his hobby of photographing wildlife. He dresses very formal. He has a crush on Hello Kitty.

English voice by Maggie Blue O'Hara.

My Melody - A cute young girl who is Kitty's best friend, loves baking cookies and sharing them with her friends. She is a rabbit who wears a red hood and she also wears a white flower near her right ear.

English voice by Andrea Kwan.

Pochacco - A friendly, slightly goofy puppy who loves to play soccer (especially goalkeeper), sleeping and solve mysteries in his spare time.

English voice by Candice Moore.

Badtz-Maru - A penguin with an good and bad attitude. Always looking for an angle, he is a precocious youngster with dreams of grandeur. His selfish ways get him in hot water from time to time, but his good heart always steers him in the right direction. Sometimes there is rivalry between him and Daniel.

English voice by Andrea Kwan.

Keroppi - A fun-loving little frog with a penchant for inventing things. He likes driving his car and playing with new toys.

English voice by Sarah Hauser.

Other
Mr. White - The teacher of the school in which Hello Kitty and her friends study. He looks a lot like Anthony, the grandfather of Kitty.

English voice by Russell Wait.

Little Twin Stars - Kiki and Lala and live on a puffy cloud in the sky. They possess magical powers with which they teach lessons and come to the rescue of Kitty and her friends. English voice by Mona Marshall.

Cinnamoroll - A sweet, shy boy who runs a coffee shop on wheels around SanrioTown. His ability to fly using his big floppy ears comes in handy. English voice by Sunday Muse.

Chococat - is a black cat with a red scarf. he doesn't talk but appears sometimes in the show. English voice by Yuri Lowenthal.

Kitty's Mother -  Kitty's mother is a white adult cat who always stays at home, her only appearance is in Episode 6. English voice by Morwenna Banks.

Wookami - Is a purple wolf who loves to cause mischief. He is basically the bad guy of the entire show.

Episode list

Awards and recognition
 Hong Kong ICT Awards 2008
 DigiCon 2008

See also
Hello Kitty

References

External links
 Official website
 Sanrio Digital
 Sanriotown
 The Adventures of Hello Kitty & Friends Released in the UK by Delta, October 2011

2000s Chinese television series
2000s animated television series
2008 Chinese television series debuts
Chinese children's animated adventure television series
Japanese children's animated adventure television series
Japanese computer-animated television series
English-language television shows
Animated television series about cats
Animated television series about children
Hello Kitty